Badminton, a racquet event, has been held at the Island Games, a biennial multi-sports event for island nations, territories and dependencies.

Badminton has been included since 1985. It was not held at the 2007 Island Games.

There are limits on the number of teams and competitors that each Island can enter. The minimum age is 13.

Events

Top Medalists

Men's singles

Top Medalists

Results

Women's singles

Top Medalists

Results

Men's doubles

Top Medalists

Results

Women's doubles

Top Medalists

Results

Mixed doubles

Top Medalists

Results

Team

Top Medalists

Results

Gold Medal Winners

Individual competition

Successful Gold Medal winners
Below is the list of the most ever successful players in badminton at the Island Games:

References

External links
IIGA Badminton
Previous Results in Island Games

 
Sports at the Island Games
Island Games